Jurd may refer to:

Stan Jurd (b. 1958), Australian rugby player
Laura Jurd (b. 1990), a British musician
Jurd, Iran, a village in Tehran Province, Iran